The West Bengal Tourism Development Corporation Limited (WBTDCL) is a state government agency which promotes tourism in West Bengal under Department of Tourism (West Bengal), India. It was incorporated on 29 April 1974 under the Companies Act, 1956.

Board of directors
The Board of Directors is appointed by the State Government and in terms of Notification no. 71-TW/IT-162/74, dt. 21.01.2014 issued by Tourism Department, Govt. of WB, the Board of Directors is reconstituted and is composed of the following.

Hotels and Lodges 
WBTDC manages lodges and hotels in 28 locations across the state of West Bengal.

See also
 Tourism in West Bengal
 Tourist attractions in West Bengal

References

External links
 Department of Tourism : Govt. of West Bengal
 West Bengal Tourism

Tourism in West Bengal
State agencies of West Bengal
Organisations based in Kolkata
State tourism development corporations of India
1974 establishments in West Bengal
Government agencies established in 1974